Sherburne-Earlville Central School is a public school located in Sherburne, New York.

The campus consists of two buildings. One building is an elementary school, consisting of levels from pre-kindergarten to the fifth grade. The second building is a combination middle school and high school. The middle school is located on the second floor of the building and ranges from sixth grade to eighth grade.  The high school, which teaches students from freshman year on, is on the first floor.

Administration 
The District offices are located 15 School Street. The current Superintendent is Mr. Robert Berson.

Administrators 

 Robert Berson–Superintendent
 Todd Griffin–Assistant Superintendent for Business
 Lacey Eaves–Director of Special Programs
 Dr. Antoinette Halliday–Director of Curriculum, Instruction, and Assessment
 Joanne Palamaro–Director of Finance and Technology
 Jeffrey Morris–Primary School Principal
 Jolene Emhof–Intermediate School Principal
 Randy Smith–Middle School Principal
 Brad Perry–MS Assistant Principal
 Michael Waters–High School Principal

Board of Education 

 Debra Kurtz–President
 Susan Osborne–Vice President
 Rachel Amann-Burns
 Cristina Baker
 Harmon Hoff
 Peter Karaman
 Gary Miller
 Jennifer Griffin–District Clerk

Sports
The middle school and high school offer an array of different sports: Field hockey, soccer, swimming, baseball, softball, basketball, cross country, track and field, football, wrestling, volleyball, golf, indoor track, bowling, and cheerleading. The sports teams are known as the Sherburne-Earlville Marauders, and the mascot is a wolf. There are three different sports levels: modified, junior varsity, and varsity.  The modified sports level consists of students who are in middle school, while junior varsity  teams generally include freshmen and sophomores and varsity-level teams include mostly sophomores, juniors, and seniors.

Course Offerings

The high school offers many different subject courses and also "free" electives. SEHS offers not only high school-level courses but a few college-level courses are also available, mainly through the Advanced Placement Program. AP courses that are offered include English Literature, Biology, Psychology, Economics, Calculus, and American and European Histories.  Sherburne-Earlville also offers certified college-level courses, such as Spanish and French IV, statistics, physics, and more through the TC3 concurrent enrollment program.  In addition, when time allows, Sherburne-Earlville students may participate in classes and certain seminars at nearby Colgate University.

Sports
The middle school and high school offer an array of different sports: Field hockey, soccer, swimming, baseball, softball, basketball, cross country, track and field, football, wrestling, volleyball, golf, indoor track, bowling, and cheerleading. The sports teams are known as the Sherburne-Earlville Marauders, and the mascot is a wolf. There are three different sports levels: modified, junior varsity, and varsity.  The modified sports level consists of students who are in middle school, while junior varsity  teams generally include freshmen and sophomores and varsity-level teams include mostly sophomores, juniors, and seniors.

The arts

Sherburne-Earlville also houses a relatively strong arts department.  The SE marching band hosts the annual Sherburne Pageant of the Bands, a prominent event featuring competitions in marching band, concert band, jazz ensemble, small ensemble, drum line and color guard. The competition attracts many surrounding high schools as well as out of state schools. The Sherburne Pageant of Bands is the largest and oldest high school band pageant in New York State.  Several music electives are offered at the school, including music theory, concert band, and chorus.  Many visual and digital arts courses are also available.  Additionally, a substantial drama department, the "Drama Club" (often in correlation with the Sherburne Music Theatre Society) has developed extracurricularly.  The school puts on an average of two shows each year (with a showcase of short one-act plays in the fall, and a longer, multi-act play in the spring), as well as an annual musical through the high school chorus.

Odyssey of the Mind

One of Sherburne-Earlville's extracurricular strong points is its participation in the Odyssey of the Mind problem-solving program.  The school frequently sends teams to the international-level finals competition (a feat that requires having placed first at the regional-level competition and first or second in the state-level competition).  In 2000, for the first time in many years, a Sherburne-Earlville team advanced to World Finals (that year held at the University of Tennessee).  In 2002, a Sherburne-Earlville team with 5 of the same members traveled to World Finals in Boulder, Colorado, and placed third in Division III Classics. In 2003, the same Division III Classics team returned to World Finals in Ames, Iowa, for the problem "Put a Spin on It" and placed first, achieving Sherburne-Earlville's first World Championship in any competition. The team (with one different member) then traveled to World Finals again in 2004.  The team was coached by Heather Pfohl, who has been involved in Odyssey of the Mind at Sherburne-Earlville for many years, and is renowned within the Sherburne-Earllvile community for her coaching success. She also coached Division III teams that traveled to World Finals in 2006 and 2007. In 2006, Heather Pfohl's team placed fourth at World Finals in the vehicle problem, "The Great Parade." In 2007, two teams (Divisions II and III, in the problem "The Large and Small of It") went to the World Finals competition at Michigan State University, receiving 1st and 4th place, respectively.  At the competition, the division II team also received a Renatra Fusca, an honor awarded to teams that exhibit commendable creativity in their problem solution.  Between the late 1990s and the present, Sherburne-Earlville teams advancing to World Finals has gone from being a very rare occurrence to the norm.

Notable alumni

Notable alumni of Sherburne-Earlville include Svante Myrick, the City of Ithaca, New York's first mayor of African-American heritage and youngest mayor, renowned chef Charlie Palmer (chef), Shamus Award-winning crime novelist Andy Straka, cartoonist Randy Glasbergen, and actor, writer, and veteran,  Benjamin Busch, who portrayed Anthony Colicchio on the HBO original series The Wire.<ref>http://www.secsd.org/community/wall/#2013/ref>

References

External links
 School's site

Educational institutions in the United States with year of establishment missing
Public elementary schools in New York (state)
Public high schools in New York (state)
Public middle schools in New York (state)
Schools in Chenango County, New York